Tomáš Sedláček (born 23 January 1977) is a Czech economist and university lecturer. He is the Chief Macroeconomic Strategist at ČSOB, a former member of the National Economic Council of the Czech Republic and an economic advisor to former President Václav Havel. In 2006, the Yale Economic Review mentioned him in an article titled "Young Guns: 5 Hot Minds in Economics". His book Economics of Good and Evil, a bestseller in the Czech Republic, was translated into English and published by the Oxford University Press in June, 2011.

Biography and career 
Sedláček was born in Roudnice nad Labem. As a child, he lived in Finland for five years and in Denmark for another four, where he attended an English-language international school(s). His father worked there as director of the ČSA, the ČSSR airtravel state company, representative offices.

In 2001, during his studies at the Charles University in Prague, he became an economic advisor to President Václav Havel. He was 24. He later commented in the Hospodářské noviny newspaper: "[The Dean of our faculty] phoned me that Mr. Fischer's office needs an economic analyst. I thought that Mr. Fischer is the owner of the same-name travel agency, and I almost refused. I wanted to devote myself to science. But the Dean then patiently explained to me that the president should not be refused. At that moment I realized that the person who contacted him was Pavel Fischer, Chief of the Political Department of the Office of the President." From November 2001 to February 2003, Sedláček worked for the Czech President.

In January, 2004, he was engaged as an advisor to the former Minister of Finance Bohuslav Sobotka. However, he left the position in 2006, according to his own words "due to excessive politicization of the work at the Ministry".

In 2006, during his scholarship at Yale University, Sedláček was listed as one of the "Young Guns: 5 Hot Minds in Economics" in the Yale Economic Review. Following his return from the United States, he was engaged as Chief Macroeconomic Strategist at the Československá obchodní banka (ČSOB). As of 2011, he still holds the position at the bank. Additionally, he is a columnist and media commentator. He also lectures at the Charles University.

Economics of Good and Evil 
The book Ekonomie dobra a zla: po stopách lidského tázání od Gilgameše po finanční krizi (published in English under the title Economics of Good and Evil: The Quest for Economic Meaning from Gilgamesh to Wall Street) is a modified version of Sedláček's thesis submitted – but rejected due to "questionable scientific value" – at the Faculty of Social Sciences of the Charles University in Prague. The book became a bestseller in the Czech Republic.

In his book, Sedláček refuses the one-sided view of economics as a value-free mathematical inquiry. He describes economics as a cultural phenomenon and a product of our civilization closely tied with philosophy, myth, religion, anthropology, and the arts. According to Sedláček, economics should not concern only abstract mathematical modelling, but also societies' values.

The broad concept of the book covers the history of economics through the millennia, "from the epic of Gilgamesh and the Old Testament to the emergence of Christianity, from Descartes and Adam Smith to Fight Club and The Matrix."

Additionally, the book explores some of the fundamental and provocative questions of the present time: "Is growth the only answer? Are we addicted to desire? Does it pay to be good?"

In 2009, the book received the Wald Press Award.  In 2012, the book won the "Deutscher Wirtschaftsbuchpreis" (2012 Frankfurt Book Fair Award) for the best economic title in Germany. The work was praised by the economics professor Deirdre McCloskey.

Works

Notes

References

External links 
 
 
 

21st-century Czech economists
Living people
1977 births
People from Roudnice nad Labem
Charles University alumni